Shira Kammen is a multi-instrumentalist and vocalist.

She received her degree in music from the University of California, Berkeley and studied vielle with Margriet Tindemans.  She has performed and taught throughout the world and has played on several television and movie soundtracks, including "O", a modern high school-setting of Othello.  Her music was also licensed for the soundtrack of the video game Braid.

She currently lives in El Cerrito, California.

Ensembles 
Shira collaborated with singer/storyteller John Fleagle for fifteen years, and has been or is a member of or worked with a number of different groups:
 Founder of Class V Music, an ensemble dedicated to performance on river rafting trips.
 The Boston Camerata
 Camerata Mediterranea
 Cançonièr, a medieval ensemble
 Ensemble Alcatraz
 Ephemeros new music group
 Fortune's Wheel, a medieval ensemble
 Hespèrion XX
 The King's Noyse
 Medieval Strings
 Panacea, an eclectic ethnic band
 Project Ars Nova
 Sequentia
 Trouz Bras, a band devoted to the dance music of Celtic Brittany
 Joanna Newsom, an American singer-songwriter and multi-instrumentalist; Kammen plays the vielle and the rebec in the song "Kingfisher" on the 2010 album Have One On Me.

Discography 
 (1988) Visions and Miracles with Ensemble Alcatraz.  Elektra Nonesuch.
 (1989) Ars Magis Subtiliter with Ensemble P.A.N. (Project Ars Nova).  New Albion Records, Inc.
 (1990) Danse Royale with Ensemble Alcatraz.  Elektra Nonesuch.
 (1991) The Island of St. Hylarion with Ensemble P.A.N. (Project Ars Nova) New Albion Records, Inc.
 (1991) Lo Gai Saber with Camerata Mediterranea.  Erato.
 (1992) Homage to Johannes Ciconia with Ensemble P.A.N. (Project Ars Nova).  New Albion Records, Inc.
 (1994) Remede de Fortune by Guillaume de Machaut with Ensemble P.A.N. (Project Ars Nova).  New Albion Records, Inc.
 (1994) The Unicorn with Anne Azéma.  Erato.
 (1994) Wings of Time with Lauren Pomerantz.  Songbird Music.
 (1995) Le Roman de Fauvel with Boston Camerata and Ensemble P.A.N. (Project Ars Nova). Erato.
 (1995) Unseen Rain with Ensemble P.A.N. (Project Ars Nova).  New Albion Records, Inc.
 (1996) Angeli with Ensemble P.A.N. (Project Ars Nova).  Telarc.
 (1996) Le Jeu d'Amour with Anne Azéma.  Erato.
 (1996) World's Bliss with John Fleagle.  Archetype Records.
 (1997) The Cloister and the Sparrow Hawk: Songs of the Monk of Montaudon (Twelfth Century) with Tim Rayborn and Alison Sabedoria.  ASV.
 (1997) Tapestry: Song of Songs: Come into my garden.  Telarc.
 (1998) Cantigas with Camerata Mediterranea.  Erato.
 (1998) Celtic Roads.  Revels Records.
 (1998) Provence Mystique with Anne Azéma.  Erato.
 (2000) Cantigas de Amigo with Ensemble Alcatraz.  Dorian.
 (2002) Music of Waters.  Bright Angel Records.
 (2002) Pastourlle with Fortune's Wheel. Dorian Recordings.
 (2003) The Almanac: Time & the Turning Wheel.  Bright Angel Records.
 (2003) The Castle of the Holly King: Secular music for the Yuletide.  Bright Angel Records.
 (2004) Across The River: Settings of poems from Lord of the Rings by J. R. R. Tolkien.  Bright Angel Records.
 (2006) Mistral.  Bright Angel Records.
 (2008) Ragged, Rent and Torn.  Bright Angel Records.
 (2010) Panacea: Songs and Dance Music of Northern and Eastern Europe with Panacea. Flaming-Buddha Music.
(2012) The Dawn of Joy. Magnatune.

References

External links 
 Shira Kammen home page

American performers of early music
Women performers of early music
Viol players
Living people
1961 births
University of California, Berkeley alumni
American folk musicians